KCBT may refer to:
KCBT-LD, a low-power digital television station on Channel 34, licensed to serve Bakersfield, California, United States.
An abbreviation for the Kansas City Board of Trade.